Lemington railway station served the district of Lemington, Newcastle-upon-Tyne, England from 1875 to 1964 on the Tyne Valley Line.

History 
The station opened on 12 July 1875 by the Scotswood, Newburn and Wylam Railway. The station was adjacent to the junction of Tyne View and Sugley Villas. The sidings served Montagu and Blucher Collieries, Carr's brickyard and a copperas works. The station closed to passengers on 15 September 1958 and closed to goods on 4 January 1960, although it reopened as a coal depot on 17 June 1963. It closed completely on 7 July 1964.

References 

Former North Eastern Railway (UK) stations
Railway stations in Great Britain opened in 1875
Railway stations in Great Britain closed in 1958
1875 establishments in England
1964 disestablishments in England